Wilhelm Fischer may refer to:
 Wilhelm Fischer (boxer) (born 1972), German boxer
 Wilhelm Fischer (musicologist) (1886–1962), Austrian musicologist
 Wilhelm Fischer (politician) (1904–1951), German politician